This is a list of United States Air Force fighter squadrons.  It covers units considered to be part of the Combat Air Force (CAF) such as fighter squadrons and serves as a break out of the comprehensive List of United States Air Force squadrons.  Units in this list are assigned to nearly every Major Command in the United States Air Force.

Fighter Squadrons

Squadrons 1 to 100

Squadrons 101 to 300

Squadrons 301 to 400

Squadrons 401 to 500

Squadrons 501 to 600

Squadrons 601 to 700

Squadrons 701 to 999

References

 Tyndall Air Force Base
 wolfhoundsusaf.com
 Real Air Force Fighter Squadron Patches

Fighter